Həsənçobanlı is a village in the Agdam District of Azerbaijan.

References

Populated places in Azerbaijan